Miscophus is a genus of square-headed wasps in the family Crabronidae. There are more than 180 described species in Miscophus.

See also
 List of Miscophus species

References

External links

 

Crabronidae
Articles created by Qbugbot